Andrew "Duke" Callaghan (February 12, 1914 – December 21, 2002) was an American cinematographer, best known for his work on television series such as Adam-12, Hart to Hart, and Miami Vice, the latter for which he received a Primetime Emmy nomination for Outstanding Cinematography for a Series. He was a frequent collaborator of directors Sydney Pollack and John Milius, shooting films like Jeremiah Johnson and The Yakuza for the former and Conan the Barbarian for the latter.

Filmography

Film

Television

References 

1914 births
2002 deaths
American cinematographers